Libonik is a village and a former municipality in Korçë County, southeastern Albania. At the 2015 local government reform it became a subdivision of the municipality Maliq. The population at the 2011 census was 8,922. The municipal unit consists of the villages Libonik, Drithas, Vloçisht, Vashtëmi, Pocestë, Symiz, Klocë, Shkozë, Kembëthekër, Beras, Zboq, Memël and Manastirec.

Transport
Libonik sits astride SH 71 where it meets European route E86/SH 3, continuing to the east as SH 101.

References

Former municipalities in Korçë County
Administrative units of Maliq
Villages in Korçë County